The  Institute of Criminology is the criminological research institute within the Faculty of Law at the University of Cambridge. The institute is one of the oldest criminological research institutes in Europe, and has exerted a strong influence on the development of criminology. Its multidisciplinary teaching and research staff are recruited from the disciplines of law, psychiatry, psychology, and sociology. It is located on the Sidgwick Site in the west of Cambridge, England. The Institute of Criminology building was designed by Allies and Morrison. The institute is also home to the Radzinowicz Library, which houses the most comprehensive criminology collection in the United Kingdom. The institute has approximately 50 PhD students, 30-40 M.Phil. students, and 200 M.St students.  The institute also offers courses to Cambridge undergraduates, particularly in law, but also in human social and political sciences and in psychology and behavioural sciences.

History 
During World War II, Sir Leon Radzinowicz established the Department of Criminal Science in the Faculty of Law at the University of Cambridge. In 1959, as the field of criminology was met with increasing interest and success, Sir Leon Radzinowicz founded the Institute of Criminology with the support of a benefaction from the Wolfson Foundation and the Howard League for Penal Reform.

Research centres 
The Institute publishes the Cambridge Crime Harm Index (CCHI), which is the first system that measures the seriousness of crime harm to victims.

 Centre for Analytic Criminology
 Centre for Community, Gender and Social Justice
 Centre for Penal Theory and Penal Ethics
 Jerry Lee Centre for Experimental Criminology
 Prisons Research Centre
 Violence Research Centre

Academic courses 
The institute offers a number of different courses, including:

 a nine-month taught M.Phil. Degree in criminology;
 a twelve-month M.Phil. Degree in criminological research;
 a two-year M.St Degree in applied criminology, penology and management (Cambridge Penology Programme), which is a postgraduate programme that equips students with cutting-edge knowledge and research skills to reflect on existing policy and practice in criminal justice; 
 a two-year M.St Degree in applied criminology and police management (Police Executive Programme), which is a postgraduate programme that offers a globally-relevant framework for preserving and enhancing democratic policing in the face of international challenges; 
 a Ph.D. programme in Criminology; 
 various undergraduate courses for Cambridge students in law, psychology, and sociology, including a joint sociology/criminology degree.

Notable people
Sir Leon Radzinowicz: the Founder of the Institute of Criminology and the first Wolfson Professor of Criminology.
Sir Anthony Bottoms: Emeritus Wolfson Professor of Criminology, Director of the Centre for Penal Theory and Penal Ethics.
Ben Crewe: Professor of Penology and Criminal Justice, Prisons Research Centre.
Manuel Eisner: Wolfson Professor of Criminology and Professor of Comparative and Developmental Criminology, Director of the Violence Research Centre.
David Farrington: Emeritus Professor of Psychological Criminology
Loraine Gelsthorpe: Professor of Criminology and Criminal Justice, Director of the institute, Director of the Centre for Community, Gender and Social Justice.
Alison Liebling: Professor of Criminology and Criminal Justice, Director of the Prisons Research Centre.
Lawrence Sherman: Director of the Cambridge Police Executive Programme.
Heather Strang: Director of the Lee Centre of Experimental Criminology.   
Per-Olof Wikström: Professor of Ecological and Developmental Criminology.

References

External links
Institute of Criminology

Criminology, Institute of